August Matias Syrjäläinen (24 April 1891 in Vyborg – 18 May 1960 in Espoo) was a Finnish football (soccer) goalkeeper who competed in the 1912 Summer Olympics.

He was a part of the Finland football team, which finished fourth in the football event. He participated in all four matches in the main tournament.

He played 5 full international matches for the Finnish team.

References

External links
 

1891 births
1960 deaths
Finnish footballers
Finland international footballers
Footballers at the 1912 Summer Olympics
Olympic footballers of Finland
Association football goalkeepers
Sportspeople from Vyborg